The Computer Conservation Society (CCS) is a British organisation, founded in 1989. It is under the joint umbrella of the British Computer Society (BCS), the London Science Museum and the Manchester Museum of Science and Industry.

Overview
The CCS is interested in the history of computing in general and the conservation and preservation of early British historical computers in particular.

The society runs a series of monthly public lectures between September and May each year in both London and Manchester.  The events are detailed on the society's website.

The CCS publishes a quarterly journal, Resurrection.

The society celebrated its 25th anniversary in 2014.

David Morriss, Rachel Burnett, and Roger Johnson are previous chairs, also all previous presidents of the BCS.

Projects
The society organises a number of projects to reconstruct and maintain early computers and to conserve early software. For example:

Restorations

 Elliott 401
 Elliott 803
 Elliott 903 and 905
 DEC Systems
 Pegasus
 ICT 1301 Project
 Harwell Dekatron Computer
 Differential Analyser
 HEC 1

Reconstructions

 Colossus Rebuild
 Manchester Baby
 Bombe Rebuild
 EDSAC Replica Project
 Babbage's Analytical Engine

Other projects

 Software preservation
 "Our Computer Heritage" website
 Tony Sale Award for computer conservation and restoration

Locations

London Science Museum:
 Ferranti Pegasus (Not currently being displayed working)

Museum of Science and Industry, Manchester:
 Manchester Baby
 Hartree Differential Analyser

The National Museum of Computing:
 Colossus
 Harwell Dekatron or WITCH
 ICL 2966
 Elliot 803
 Elliott 905
 EDSAC Replica

Bletchley Park Trust:
 Bombe

Currently not on public display:
 ICT 1301 (Currently in storage at The National Museum of Computing)
 Elliott 401

References

External links
 CCS website
 Our Computer Heritage – a project led by the CCS

Scientific organizations established in 1989
Information technology organisations based in the United Kingdom
History of science organizations
History of computing in the United Kingdom
BCS Specialist Groups
Science Museum, London
1989 establishments in the United Kingdom